Rana Tharu may refer to:

 Rana Tharu, an ethnic group generally classified as part of the Tharu people of Nepal and India
 Rana Tharu language, their language

See also 
 Puran Rana Tharu, Nepalese politician

Language and nationality disambiguation pages